Yevgeny Isaakovitch Utin (3 November 1843 – 9 August 1894) was a Russian lawyer and journalist. He was arrested in the student unrest in Saint Petersburg in 1861 and held in the Peter and Paul Fortress for some time. After graduating from the Faculty of Law at Saint Petersburg University, he spent several years abroad. He participated in the trial of Sergey Nechayev and other political defendants.

Utin was an active writer for Vestnik Evropy from its inception in 1866. He reported on the Russo-Turkish War from Bulgaria.

Selected publications 
 Вильгельм I и Бисмарк ("Wilhelm I and Bismarck"), 1892
 Из литературы и жизни ("From Literature and Life"), 1896, 2 volumes. Posthumous publication of his most important journal articles.

Bibliography 
 
 
 
 

Russian journalists
Russian lawyers
Russian activists
1843 births
1894 deaths
Russian political prisoners
Russian duellists
Print journalists
Prisoners of the Peter and Paul Fortress